Şitoaia may refer to several places in Romania:

 Şitoaia,  a village in Almăj Commune, Dolj County
 Şitoaia,  a village in Roșia de Amaradia Commune, Gorj County